The word Věstonice may refer to several geographical locations and objects in the Břeclav District, Southern Moravia, (Czech Republic):
 Dolní Věstonice - a village and archeological site 
 Dolní Věstonice (archaeology) - Upper Paleolithic excavation site
 Venus of Dolní Věstonice - ceramic figurine of a nude woman, dated 29.000 - 25.000 BC 
 Horní Věstonice - a village in Břeclav District
 Věstonice Reservoir - Nové Mlýny